Greg Frewin is a Canadian illusionist and "World Champion of Magic". His awards include First Place at the International Brotherhood of Magicians (IBM); The Gold Medal of Excellence, also from the IBM; First Place at the Society of American Magicians' annual magic convention competition; and first place at FISM, the "Olympics of Magic", which were held in Yokohama, Japan in 1994.

A command performance for Prince Rainier in Monte Carlo along with over 35 TV appearances worldwide attest to this magician's notoriety, Greg is recognized by his peers all over the world as "The International Grand Champion of Magic".

Frewin has appeared on stages all over the world, including Caesars Palace, Tropicana and the Flamingo Hilton in Las Vegas. He is currently signed to a 20-year performance contract at the Greg Frewin Theatre in Niagara Falls, Ontario, Canada.

In 2009 Frewin won the World Magic Awards Magician of the Year.

Frogwater Media Inc  in association with CBC produced a Holiday Special called Greg Frewin Magic Man Home for the holidays in 2009

Awards
 Niagara Falls Misty Award " Attraction of the Year - 2005 
 Canadian Association of Magicians - Magician of the Year (first ever)
 1st place Stage International Brotherhood of Magicians
 The Gold Medal of Excellence awarded by the International Brotherhood of Magicians
 1st place Stage Society of American Magicians
 1st place at FISM
 2009 Magician of the Year - World Magic Awards

References

External links
The Greg Frewin Theatre

Canadian magicians
Sleight of hand
People from Hamilton, Ontario
Living people
1967 births